Medway Estuary and Marshes is a  biological Site of Special Scientific Interest which stretches along the banks of the River Medway between Gillingham and Sheerness in Kent. It is a Nature Conservation Review site, Grade I,  a Ramsar internationally important wetland site, and a Special Protection Area under the European Union Directive on the Conservation of Wild Birds.

This site is internationally important for its wintering birds, and nationally important for its breeding birds. It is also has an outstanding flora, such as the nationally rare oak-leaved goosefoot and the nationally scarce slender hare's-ear.

References

Sites of Special Scientific Interest in Kent
Special Protection Areas in England
Nature Conservation Review sites
Ramsar sites in England